"Mother" is the fifth single by Japanese rock band Luna Sea, released on February 22, 1995. The song reached number 5 on the Oricon Singles Chart, and charted for eight weeks. This version of the title track is slightly different from the one on the album, Mother. The B-side is a live version of "Déjàvu" recorded on December 27, 1994 at the Nippon Budokan.

Track listing
All songs written and composed by Luna Sea.

"Mother" - 5:35Composed by Inoran.
"Déjàvu (Live Version)" - 3:54Composed by Sugizo.

References

Luna Sea songs
1995 singles
MCA Records singles
1994 songs